Aninoasa is a commune in Argeș County, Muntenia, Romania. It is composed of four villages: Aninoasa, Broșteni, Slănic and Valea Siliștii.

The commune is located in the north-central part of the county. It is crossed by the DN73C road that connects Câmpulung ( to the northeast) to Curtea de Argeș ( to the west). The river Bratia passes through the Aninoasa and Valea Siliștii villages.

The  (dating from 1678) is situated on the territory of the commune.

References

Communes in Argeș County
Localities in Muntenia